The Cricket Society is a charitable organisation founded in 1945 as the Society of Cricket Statisticians at Great Scotland Yard, London. It has grown steadily to be the largest body of its kind in the cricket world.   The Cricket Society now has more than 2000 members in the United Kingdom and the cricket playing countries of the world. Its current President is John Barclay.

Activities
The Wetherall Awards began in 1967 and presently continue in four separate categories:
Leading all-rounder in English first-class game
Leading Young All-Rounder in the English First-Class Game
Leading all-rounder in Schools cricket
Leading all-rounder at Repton School

The Cricket Society instigated an Annual Book of the Year Award in 1970 that now, in association with the MCC, hosts an Awards Evening in the Long Room at Lord's each spring.

Throughout the winter months, The Society holds monthly meetings, featuring famous names from cricket, for members and guests at the Royal Overseas League in Park Place, London SW1.

Through its charitable trust, it raises money to coach underprivileged children in the skills of cricket. They link up with various organisations such as the Arundel Castle  Cricket Foundation to achieve these aims.

The Society has a cricket team which plays at a number of venues each season. It also holds monthly meetings for the members in London (as detailed above), Bath, Birmingham and Durham at which invited speakers address the audience. These activities are held to maintain an interest in cricket and both inform and entertain its members and guests through the off-season.

The Cricket Society publishes a journal, bi-annually and a regular news bulletin, 8 times per year, for its subscribed membership.

The Society commissioned E.W. Padwick to compile a comprehensive bibliography of cricket literature under the title A Bibliography of Cricket. The first edition, published in 1977 by the Library Association had 8,294 entries. A revised edition, published in 1984, extended this to over 10,000 entries. A second volume, published in 1991 as Padwick's Bibliography of Cricket, Volume 2, was compiled by Stephen Eley and Peter Griffiths and covers works published between 1980 and 1990.

The Cricket Society/MCC Book of the Year
The Cricket Society began naming a book of the year in 1970. Since 2009 the award has been made in partnership with MCC. It carries a prize of £3000, which is presented at an awards evening each spring in the Long Room at Lord's.

 1970: "My Dear Victorious Stod": A Biography of A. E. Stoddart by David Frith
 1971: Nottinghamshire Cricketers 1821–1914 by Peter Wynne-Thomas
 1972: Thanks to Cricket by J. M. Kilburn 
 1973: Sort of a Cricket Person by E. W. Swanton
 1974: The Story of Warwickshire Cricket 1882–1972 by Leslie Duckworth
 1975: Learie Constantine by Gerald Howat 
 1976: On Top Down Under: Australia's Cricket Captains by Ray Robinson
 1977: Spinner's Yarn by Ian Peebles 
 1978: Sir Donald Bradman: A Biography by Irving Rosenwater
 1979: The Best Loved Game by Geoffrey Moorhouse
 1980: Barclay's World of Cricket by E. W. Swanton and John Woodcock
 1981: P. G. H. Fender: A Biography by Richard Streeton 
 1982: Phoenix from the Ashes by Mike Brearley
 1983: Australian Cricket: The Game and the Players by Jack Pollard
 1984: C.B.: The Life of Charles Burgess Fry by Clive Ellis 
 1985: The Art of Captaincy by Mike Brearley
 1986: Hedley Verity: A Portrait of a Cricketer by Alan Hill
 1987: Pageant of Cricket by David Frith 
 1988: The Players: A Social History of the Professional Cricketer by Ric Sissons
 1989: A La Recherche du Cricket Perdu by Simon Barnes 
 1990: History of Indian Cricket by Mihir Bose 
 1991: Herbert Sutcliffe: Cricket Maestro by Alan Hill
 1992: England Expects: A Biography of Ken Barrington by Mark Peel 
 1993: Beyond Bat & Ball by David Foot 
 1994: Arlott: The Authorised Biography by David Rayvern Allen 
 1995: David Gower: A Man Out of Time by Rob Steen 
 1996: Bradman: An Australian Hero by Charles Williams
 1997: The Glory Days of Cricket: The Extraordinary Story of Broadhalfpenny Down by Ashley Mote 
 1998: The Chronicle of W. G. by J. R. Webber; W. G. Grace: A Life by Simon Rae (shared)
 1999: The Social History of English Cricket by Derek Birley
 2000: Mystery Spinner: The Story of Jack Iverson by Gideon Haigh
 2001: At the Heart of English Cricket: The Life and Memories of Geoffrey Howard by Stephen Chalke
 2002: A Corner of a Foreign Field: The Indian History of a British Sport by Ramachandra Guha 
 2003: The Ross Gregory Story by David Frith 
 2004: Jim: The Life of E. W. Swanton by David Rayvern Allen 
 2005: Red Shirts and Roses by Eric Midwinter 
 2006: Cricket's Burning Passion: Ivo Bligh and the Story of the Ashes by Scyld Berry and Rupert Peploe 
 2007: George Lohmann: Pioneer Professional by Keith Booth
 2008: No award with this date. Before 2008 the award was for books published in the year of the award; after 2008 the award was for books published the previous year.
 2009: Life Beyond the Airing Cupboard by John Barclay
 2010: Of Didcot and the Demon: The Cricketing Times of Alan Gibson by Anthony Gibson
 2011: Slipless in Settle by Harry Pearson
 2012: Fred Trueman: The Authorised Biography by Chris Waters
 2013: On Warne by Gideon Haigh
 2014: The Great Tamasha: Cricket, Corruption and the Turbulent Rise of Modern India by James Astill
 2015: Field of Shadows: The English Cricket Tour of Nazi Germany 1937 by Dan Waddell
 2016: Fire in Babylon by Simon Lister
 2017: A Beautiful Game: My Love Affair with Cricket by Mark Nicholas
 2018: Connie: The Marvellous Life of Learie Constantine by Harry Pearson 
 2019: Steve Smith's Men: Behind Australian Cricket's Fall by Geoff Lemon
 2020: The Great Romantic: Cricket and the Golden Age of Neville Cardus by Duncan Hamilton; The Final Innings: The Cricketers of Summer 1939 by Christopher Sandford (shared)
 2021: The Unforgiven by Ashley Gray

Current officers
 President John Barclay 
 Vice-President Chris Lowe
 Vice-President Charlotte Edwards
 Vice-President Vic Marks
 Vice-President Sir Tim Rice
 Vice-President Derek Underwood

Executive committee
 Chairman Nigel Hancock
 Vice Chairman Phil Reeves
 Secretary Geoffrey Levett
 Treasurer Phil Reeves
 Membership Secretary Matthew Stevenson
 Peter Hardy
 Nick Tudball
 Derek Barnard
 Barry Kitcherside
 Rafaelle Nicholson

Presidents since 1945 

• 1945-1946 F. A. Mackinnon, The Mackinnon of Mackinnon
• 1947-1959 Hubert Preston 
• 1960-1961 H. S. Altham 
• 1961-1962 Lord Birkett 
• 1963-1968 A. A. Thomson 
• 1969-1973 Lt-Gen Sir Oliver Leese 
• 1974-1975 A. M. Crawley 
• 1976-1983 E. W. Swanton 
• 1983-1998 G. H. G. Doggart 
• 1998-2008 C. D. A. Martin-Jenkins 
• 2008-onwards J. R. T. Barclay

Chairs since 1945

• 1945-1946 A. Weigall 
• 1946-1947 Capt. J. A. Bayliss 
• 1947-1953 G. A. Copinger 
• 1953-1960 A. R. Whitaker 
• 1960-1965 Dr R. W. Cockshut 
• 1965-1966 L. E. S. Gutteridge 
• 1966-1983 C. C. W. Box-Grainger 
• 1983-1992 R. N. Haygarth 
• 1992-2003 D. Allsop
• 2003-2008 W. R. Allen 
• 2008 I. R. Jackson 
• 2008-2012 D. E. Barnard 
• 2012 onwards Nigel Hancock

References

External links
The Cricket Society web site
Brief history (to 1979)
Cricket Society cricket team

Cricket historians and writers
Clubs and societies in London
Sports writing awards